The Stroud House was a historic house at 204 Third Street in Rogers, Arkansas.  It was a -story wood-frame cottage, set across Third Street from Bentonville City Hall.  It was designed by architect A. O. Clark in Colonial Revival and Stick/Eastlake architecture for a leading local merchant.  It had a wide porch cross the front, supported by Tuscan columns, with a central segmented-arch section above the stairs.

The house was listed on the U.S. National Register of Historic Places in 1988.  It was subsequently demolished, and was delisted in 2018.

See also
Stroud House (Bentonville, Arkansas), also NRHP-listed
National Register of Historic Places listings in Benton County, Arkansas

References

Houses on the National Register of Historic Places in Arkansas
1912 establishments in Arkansas
Colonial Revival architecture in Arkansas
Houses completed in 1912
Houses in Rogers, Arkansas
National Register of Historic Places in Benton County, Arkansas
Demolished buildings and structures in Arkansas
Former National Register of Historic Places in Arkansas
Stick-Eastlake architecture in the United States